Cleansing may refer to:

 Ethnic cleansing, the systematic forced removal of ethnic or religious groups from a given territory by a more powerful ethnic group
 Cleanliness, the abstract state of being clean and free from dirt, and the process of achieving and maintaining that state
 Data cleansing, in data management, the detection and correction of corrupt or inaccurate records
 Social cleansing, the elimination of "undesirable" social elements
 Detoxification (alternative medicine) or body cleansing, is a disputed alternative medical practice
 Colon cleansing, an alternative medicine involving the use of enemas and diets, often as part of detoxification
 Cleansing (album), an album by Prong
"The Cleansing", a song by Overkill from the album The Killing Kind
 Zachistka ("cleansing operation"), house-to-house operations mostly associated with the reinstatement of Russian rule in Chechnya

See also
 Cleaning (disambiguation)
 Cleanliness
 The Cleansing (disambiguation)
 Ritual purification